Russell Milton (born 12 January 1969) is an English former professional footballer, born in Folkestone, who played as a midfielder in the Hong Kong First Division League for Instant-Dict and in The J League alongside Brazilian legends Socrates and Serginho. He scored 14 goals from 117 games in the Football League for Cheltenham Town and played over 200 times for them in total. He began his football career at Arsenal, where he stayed until the age of 21 being a first team squad member for 3 years. He also played non-league football for Dover Athletic and Bath City, for whom he made 51 appearances (40 in the league) and scored 8 goals.

Milton is a qualified PE teacher and previously took a degree in sports science, ran a football coaching school with Arsenal FC, commentated on Cheltenham Town matches for local BBC radio and lectured at the University of Gloucestershire. He has also worked for the Press Association, Opta and is currently the Premier League correspondent for Radio Sport National Australia.

On 13 February 2015, he was named as caretaker-manager of Cheltenham Town and is currently assistant manager with 3 stints as caretaker boss and a win ratio of over 35% in over 25 games.

Playing Honours

Cheltenham Town
 FA Trophy winners: 1997–98
 Football Conference runners-up: 1997–98
 Football Conference winners: 1998–99
 Third Division play-off winners: 2001–02

Coaching Honours

Cheltenham Town
Vanarama National League Winners: 2015-16
League Two Champions: 2020-21

References

External links
 
 

1969 births
Living people
People from Folkestone
English footballers
Association football midfielders
Arsenal F.C. players
Double Flower FA players
Dover Athletic F.C. players
Cheltenham Town F.C. players
Bath City F.C. players
Hong Kong First Division League players
English Football League players
National League (English football) players
England semi-pro international footballers
Cheltenham Town F.C. non-playing staff
Expatriate footballers in Hong Kong
Southern Football League players
English football managers
English Football League managers
Cheltenham Town F.C. managers
Kashiwa Reysol players
English expatriate sportspeople in Hong Kong
English expatriate footballers
English expatriate sportspeople in Japan